David Sutton (born 1966) is the current editor of the Fortean Times magazine. Sutton was born in Canterbury, Kent. He was educated at the University of East Anglia, University College London, Birkbeck College and the British Film Institute. He holds a doctorate, earned for his thesis on the origins and progress of British film comedy, and is the author of the book A Chorus of Raspberries: British Film Comedy, 1929-1939.

Bibliography

Books

A Chorus of Raspberries: British Film Comedy, 1929-1939 (University of Exeter Press, 2000),

Articles

 "The Enfield Poltergeist Case" (2003) Fortean Times #166, about the Enfield Poltergeist
 "Surreality TV: The Ghostwatch Flap" (2003) Fortean Times #166, about the controversy caused by Stephen Volk's Ghostwatch
 "King of Kings" (2003) Fortean Times #166, about the cult of Elvis Presley
 "Bodyguard of Lies" (2004) Fortean Times #185, about the Allies' D-Day deception plans
 "The Ultimate in Adventure" (2006) Fortean Times #206, about Merian C. Cooper and King Kong
 "From Deep Space to The Nine" (2006) Fortean Times #215, about Gene Roddenberry and The Nine
 "Conventional Wisdom" (2006) Fortean Times #215, about Star Trek conventions
 "How the Nazis Stole Christmas" (2006) Fortean Times #218, about Christmas in the Third Reich
 "Vaughan Williams: Toward the Unknown Region" (2008) Fortean Times #241, about composer Ralph Vaughan Williams

Interviews

 "Writing the Book of the Dead" (2002) Fortean Times #164, with author Dennis McNally about the Grateful Dead
 "Never Mind Da Vinci" (2005) Fortean Times #198, with Rat Scabies
 "The Man With the Shrunken Head" (2007) Fortean Times #230, with Edward Meyer of Ripley's Believe It or Not

References 

1966 births
Living people
Alumni of the University of East Anglia
Alumni of University College London
Alumni of Birkbeck, University of London
Fortean writers
British magazine editors